Alltag, released in 2003 by Turkish-German director Neco Celik, is a film depicting life in the neighborhood of Kreuzberg. The film has particular significance in the arena of Turkish-German hip-hop and hip-hop life in the neighborhood. Celik was born in 1972 and grew up in the neighborhood of Kreuzberg, and was directly influenced by the presence of hip hop and gang culture in Kreuzberg.  
Many people see the film as testament to the Americanization of cultures in Europe and a report from the "frontlines". The film is not only evidence  of the prevalence of hip hop in ethnic minorities in Germany, but the popularity of hip hop in Germany. The film has critics dubbing Neco Celik as the next Spike Lee.

Cast 
 Florian Panzner as Veit Bischoff
  as Aliya Emre
 Erhan Emre as Jabbar
  as Kida

References

External links

2003 television films
2003 films
Films set in Berlin
Hood films
2000s hip hop films
German television films
2000s German films
Das Erste original programming